Tamara Jill Barton (formerly May) is an Australian entrepreneur and the founder of MyBudget.

Personal life 
Tammy Barton is an Australian entrepreneur, businessperson and personal finance expert. She is the founding director of MyBudget, a personal budgeting service based in Australia that aims to help people take control of their finances through budgeting and money management.

She has won many awards, including twice being awarded the Telstra Business Woman of the Year (Entrepreneur-South Australia), 2007 and 2017. Barton is recognised as one of Australia's most influential businesswomen and she regularly appears in the media as an expert on personal money management and household budgeting.

Career 
Barton started MyBudget as a home-based business in Adelaide in 1999 at the age of 22 after working at a debt collection agency where she witnessed the damaging effects of financial stress on people. The business has since grown into a national company that employs more than 250 staff in 15 offices across Australia. During that time, the company has delivered its money management services to more than 65,000 clients.

On 26 October 2012, Barton became an appointee to the BankSA Advisory Board. Chairman Rob Chapman said Barton brought "strong credentials and a passionate commitment to helping South Australia prosper and grow". To this day, Barton remains director of and spokesperson for MyBudget.

For her business achievements, Barton has been recognised with a number of awards and honours, see below. During her acceptance speech at the Telstra South Australian Business Woman of the Year Awards in October 2017, Barton announced that MyBudget would be opening its first international branch, in the United Kingdom, in 2018 to further what she described as her "commitment to helping lead the global financial fitness movement."

In May 2020, MyBudget was the confirmed target of a malware attack.

Awards and recognition 
Barton has won numerous awards throughout her career including being a two-time winner of the Telstra South Australian Business Woman of the Year Award (2007 and 2017). She has appeared in SmartCompany's list of Australia's Top 30 Female Entrepreneurs in 2015 through to 2017 and was awarded Female Entrepreneur of the Year by the League of Extraordinary Women in 2015.

Summary of awards:
 Telstra South Australian Business Woman of the Year Award, 2017 
 Smartcompany Australia's Top 30 Female Entrepreneur
 League of Extraordinary Women Female Entrepreneur of the Year, 2015, 2016 and 2017
 Start Up Daily No 1. Top Female Entrepreneur under 40, 2014
 Australian Financial Review 100 Women of Influence Awards, 2012
 International Business Times Australia Top 100 Women of Influence, 2012
 Telstra South Australian Business Woman of the Year Award, 2007
 Telstra Business Owner Award, 2007
 Australian Government Business Innovation Award, 2007
 Ernst and Young's Entrepreneur of the Year Finalist, 2008

Notes

References 

1978 births
Living people
Australian businesspeople
People educated at Cardijn College